{{Infobox film
| name           = Saveray Wali Gaadi
| image          = Saveray Wali Gaadi.jpg
| alt            = 
| caption        = Poster
| native_name    = 
| director       = Bharathiraja
| writer         = 
| screenplay     = 
| story          = 
| based_on       = Bharathiraja's Tamil film Kizhakke Pogum Rail
| producer       = R.K Soral
| starring       = Sunny DeolPoonam DhillonPrem ChopraBindu
| narrator       = 
| cinematography = B. Kannan
| editing        = David Dhawan
| music          = R. D. Burman
| studio         = 
| distributor    = 
| released       = 
| runtime        = 
| country        = India
| language       = Hindi
| budget         = 
| gross          = 
}}Saveray Wali Gaadi is a 1986 Indian romantic drama film directed by Bharathiraja. The film stars Sunny Deol and Poonam Dhillon. It is a remake of Bharathiraja's Tamil film Kizhakke Pogum Rail''.

Plot 
Ravidas (Sunny Deol) lives in a village in rural India. He is the son of Chediram (Dr.Shreeram Lagoo) who is of highly respected in the village. He has a younger sister Pushpa (Kiran Vairale) who later gets married and goes to her in-laws house. Ravidas falls in love with Jyoti (Poonam Dhillon). Their love becomes known in the village. Because of differences of caste, the villagers are opposed to Ravidas marrying Jyoti.

Once the villagers see Ravidas and Jyoti talking privately in village, in  panchayat meeting some villagers are false accusation on Ravidas of molestation to Jyoti. The panchayat punishes him to go around the whole village by making his head bald and sitting on a donkey. Ravidas's father Chediram commits suicide due to the shame his son has brought upon him.

Ravidas is a gifted poet, but he cannot fulfill his dream of being recognized as a great poet, his poems being published and shown to the world, because he lives in a village. So he decides to go to the city to fulfill his dreams and to eventually marry Jyoti.

In the city he recovers the purse of a young lady, Rama (Natasha Sinha) from a thief. The young lady turns out to be the daughter of a big newspaper publisher, Jankidasji (Jankidas). The newspaper publisher, Jankidasji hears of Ravidas's talent for poetry through his daughter, Rama. He publishes some of Ravidas's poems in a column in his newspaper. Ravidas starts becoming famous and his dream is fulfilled.

He communicates to Jyoti by writing on the side of the morning express train, hence the title of the film Saveray Wali Gaadi. Jyoti reads these message each morning hoping for the time when Ravidas will return and take her away with him.

In village, Jyoti's elder sister, Sukhdai (Bindu) is opposed to her and Ravidas's love, so her sister brings a marriage relation for Jyoti. But Jyoti tells the boy that he should refuse to marry because she loves someone else. Therefore, at the behest of Jyoti, that boy gives up his mind for marriage.

Jyoti's brother-in-law, Jija Kishanlal (Prem Chopra) likes Her (Jyoti) and want to marry her. He used to try to flirt with her. One day he held a panchayat meeting in the village and demanded from the Sarpanch that his wife (Sukhdai) does not have a child, so he should get married to his sister-in-law (Jyoti). He said to his wife if she (Sukhdai) does not agree to marriage of his and her sister(Jyoti), she will have to leave the house. Hearing all this Sher Singh, a retired army man (Dharmendra) (Special Appearance) opposes this in meeting. Sher Singh was the man who always spoke against wrong things in Village.

That's why Sukhdai tries to convince Jyoti to marry her brother-in-law, Jija so that her husband does not leave her home. Jyoti gets very sad hearing all this. Jyoti misses her love Ravidas very much and in the morning writes a message for Ravidas on the train's  front coach with chalks that come back early from city, nothing is fine. But due to rain Train before reaching city (Ravidas place) her message gets erased and Ravidas is unable to read.

One day there is heavy rain and flood in the village. Such rain came in the village after 50 years. The Pandit (C.S. Dubey) of the village suggests to the Sarpanch (Om Shivpuri) and village people that it had rained like this 50 years ago, then in village, special puja (worship) was performed to pacify the goddess of the village. 50 years ago, due to this puja (worship), the goddess had calmed down and the rain had stopped and the village was saved from drowning.

puja (worship) is such that a girl from the village will go round the whole village at midnight without clothes. And no male of the village will come out of the house at the time of puja (worship). They believed that by doing such a puja (worship), the goddess will calm down and the rain and storm will stop in the village and the village will be saved from drowning.

The Pandit suggests to the people of the village and to the Sarpanch that the names of all the young and unmarried girls of the village are written on chit and The girl whose name will come out on chit will have to do this puja (worship). Sher Singh gets angry after hearing all this, but no one listens to him because everyone was worried about saving the village. Then Sher Singh gets angry and leaves from him.

Guptaji (Satyen Kappu) tells a Pandit in private if his girl's name comes, then his girl will be infamous and no one will marry her. Then Pandit makes a conspiracy against Jyoti, he writes Jyoti's name on everyone so that Jyoti's name comes out and she (puja) worship. Jyoti's name comes out, she becomes very sad and refuses to doing puja (worship).

Suddenly the rain stops before the puja (worship), The people of the village become happy and thank the goddess. then Kishanlal Jyoti's brother-in-law says that the rain has stopped, now we will stop the puja (worship). But the pandit says that we thought of worshiping, so the rain stopped, if we stop the puja (worship), then it will rain again in the village. The women of the village convince Jyoti for doing puja (worship). She hardly agrees for the betterment of the village.

In other hand in the city Rama started liking Ravidas, He leaves to go to the village to meet Jyoti when he tells Rama everything about Jyoti and his love.

On the same day Ravidas leaves the city for the village and when he reaches the village at midnight, suddenly he sees Jyoti without clothes on village street And shouting loudly, runs away with Jyoti. The people of the village, seeing that Ravidas obstructed the puja (worship), so the Sarpanch orders villagers to killed Ravidas.

Ravidas enters a temple with Jyoti, he gets some clothes for Jyoti to wear. Both of them run towards the train to leave the village but the villagers surround them. Then Sher Singh comes, he fights with all the villagers so that Ravidas and Jyoti can catch the train comfortably. But unfortunately villagers killed Sher Singh, Sher Singh sacrificed his life for them. And in the end, both of them board the train very hard and leave the village happily hugging each other. After all, both of them become successful in their love and happily live a new life.

Cast 
 Sunny Deol as Ravidas
 Poonam Dhillon as Jyoti (Ravidas's Love Interest)
 Prem Chopra as Kishanlal (Sukhdai's Husband)
 Bindu as Sukhdai (Jyoti's Elder Sister)
 Shreeram Lagoo as Chhediram (Ravidas's Father)
 Dharmendra as Retired Army Man, Sher Singh (Special Appearance)
 Om Shivpuri as Thakur (Village Sarpanch)
 Kiran Vairale as Pushpa (Ravidas's Younger Sister)
 Satyen Kappu as Guptaji
 C.S. Dubey as Pandit
 Jankidas as Jankidasji, (Newspaper publication Owner)
 Natasha Sinha as Rama (Daughter of Jankidasji)

Soundtrack

References

External links 
 

1986 films
1980s Hindi-language films
Films directed by Bharathiraja
Films scored by R. D. Burman
Hindi remakes of Tamil films